Montreuil-des-Landes (Gallo: Montroelh-dez-Laundd) is a commune in the Ille-et-Vilaine department of Brittany in northwestern France.

Population
Inhabitants of Montreuil-des-Landes are called in French montreuillais.

See also
Communes of the Ille-et-Vilaine department

References

External links

Mayors of Ille-et-Vilaine Association 

Communes of Ille-et-Vilaine